Archer Fausto (born 13 October 1962) is a Mozambican boxer. He competed in the men's flyweight event at the 1988 Summer Olympics.

References

External links
 

1962 births
Living people
Mozambican male boxers
Olympic boxers of Mozambique
Boxers at the 1988 Summer Olympics
Place of birth missing (living people)
Flyweight boxers